Norifusa (written: 教房, 紀房 or 則房) is a masculine Japanese given name. Notable people with the name include:

 (1559–1598), Japanese samurai
 (1423–1480), Japanese kugyō
 (born 1958), Japanese manga artist

Japanese masculine given names